Nathalie Simon may refer to:

Nathalie Simon (athlete) (born 1962), French Olympic sprinter
 (born 1964), French television and radio host for Première Compagnie (France series 1)